Barbara Evans Fleischauer (born September 1, 1953 in Homestead, Pennsylvania) is an American politician and a Democratic member of the West Virginia House of Delegates representing District 51 since January 12, 2013. Fleischauer served consecutively from January 2007 until January 2013 and non-consecutively from January 1995 until January 2005 in a District 44 seat.

In November 2021, Fleischauer announced she would not seek re-election to the House of Delegates and instead run for the 13th District in the 2022 elections for the West Virginia Senate.

Barbara has also been a stalwart for lower insulin prices, having led caravans as a private citizen to Canada to help West Virginians afford insulin

Politics 
Until Republicans gained control of the House following the 2014 elections, Fleischauer chaired the Committee on Constitutional Revision during the 73rd, 74th, 75th, 76th, 78th, 79th, 80th and 81st Legislatures (1996-2004; 2006-2014); co-chaired the Equal Pay Commission during the 73rd, 74th and 75th Legislatures (1996-2002); and co-chaired the Juvenile Task Force during the 73rd, 74th and 75th Legislatures (1996-2002).

Since the 2014 elections, Fleischauer has served as Minority chair of the House Judiciary Committee during the 84th Legislature (2018-2020) and Minority chair of the Veterans Affairs Committee during the 85th Legislature (2020-2022).

In 2018, Democrats — including Fleischauer — swept all five seats in the 51st district, the largest multi-member district in the House. As a result, the Monongalia County delegates, all Democrats, called themselves “The Fab Five” and frequently voted and worked together on bills. This was especially notable given that Fleischauer was the only Democratic member of the delegation just four years earlier, after the 2014 elections. In 2020, Delegate Rodney Pyles was defeated for re-election by former Republican Delegate Joe Statler, breaking the all-Democratic delegation.

Personal
Fleischauer earned her BA degree from Allegheny College and her JD from the West Virginia University College of Law. She is married to West Virginia University College of Law Professor Bob Bastress and has two children.

Elections

2010 election

Primary election

General election

2012 election

Primary election

General election

2014 election

Primary election

General election

2016 election

Primary election

General election

2018 election

Primary election

General election

2020 election

Primary election

General election

2012 Redistricted to District 51 alongside the other three District 44 incumbents, Fleischauer placed second in the five-way May 8, 2012 Democratic Primary with 5,226 votes (24.5%), and placed third in the eleven-way five-position November 6, 2012 General election with 14,381 votes (10.8%), behind incumbent Democratic Representative Charlene Marshall, former Republican Representative Cindy Frich, and ahead of incumbent Representatives Amanda Pasdon and Anthony Barill and non-selectees Republican nominee Kevin Poe (who had run for a District 44 seat in 2010), Democratic nominees Nancy Jamison and Billy Smerka, Republican nominees John Woods and Jay Redmond, and American Third Position candidate Harry Bertram, who had run for governor in 2011.
1990s & Early 2000s Fleischauer was initially elected to a District 44 seat in the 1994 Democratic Primary and November 8, 1994 General election, and was re-elected in the general election of November 5, 1996.
1998 Fleischauer placed in the seven-way Democratic Primary and was re-elected in the eight-way four-position November 3, 1998 General election with nominees Sheirl Fletcher (R), Charlene Marshall (D), and Nancy Houston (D).
2000 Fleischauer placed in the six-way 2000 Democratic Primary and was re-elected in the seven-way four position November 7, 2000 with incumbent Representatives Fletcher (R) and Marshall (D) and Democratic nominee Robert Beach, unseating Representative Houston (D).
2002 When Representative Marshall ran for West Virginia Senate and Representative Fletcher left the Legislature leaving two district seats open, Fleischauer placed in the nine-way 2002 Democratic Primary and was re-elected in the seven-way four-position November 5, 2002 General election with incumbent Representative Beach (D), returning Representative Houston, and Republican nominee Cindy Frich.
2004 Fleischauer placed in the five-way 2004 Democratic Primary but lost the eight-way four-position November 2, 2004 General election which re-elected incumbent Representatives Beach (D), Frich (R), and Houston (D), and reseated former Representative Marshall (D).
2006 When Representative Houston left the Legislature and left a district seat open, Fleischauer placed in the six-way 2006 Democratic Primary and was re-elected in the eight-way four-position November 7, 2006 General election alongside incumbent Democratic Representatives Beach (D) and Marshall(D) and Democratic nominee Alex Shook.
2008 Fleischauer placed second in the five-way May 13, 2008 Democratic Primary with 8,933 votes (23.5%), and placed fourth in the six-way four-position November 4, 2008 General election with 16,061 votes (17.8%) behind incumbent Democratic Representatives Shook, Marshall, and Beach.
2010 When Representative Robert Beach ran for West Virginia Senate and left a seat open, Fleischauer placed second in the six-way May 11, 2010 Democratic Primary with 4,819 votes (22.6%), and placed second in the ten-way four-position November 2, 2010 General election with 9,736 votes (12.5%) behind incumbent Democratic Representative Charlene Marshall and ahead of Republican nominee Amanda Pasdon, Democratic nominee Anthony Barill, and non-selectees Chris Walters (R), Stephen Cook (D), Kevin Poe (R), Kevin Patrick (R), Paul Brown (I), and Tad Britch (L).

References

External links
Official page at the West Virginia Legislature
Campaign site

Barbara Fleischauer at Ballotpedia
Barbara Evans Fleischauer at the National Institute on Money in State Politics

1953 births
Living people
Allegheny College alumni
Democratic Party members of the West Virginia House of Delegates
People from Homestead, Pennsylvania
Politicians from Morgantown, West Virginia
West Virginia University College of Law alumni
West Virginia lawyers
Women state legislators in West Virginia
21st-century American politicians
21st-century American women politicians
20th-century American politicians
20th-century American women politicians
Lawyers from Morgantown, West Virginia